HD 189567 is a G3V star located 58.5 light years away, in the constellation of Pavo. The star HD 189567 is also known as Gliese 776, CD-67 2385, and HR 7644.

The star is moderately depleted in heavy elements, having 55% of the solar abundance of iron, but is less depleted in oxygen, having 80% of its solar abundance.

Planetary system
One exoplanet was discovered around the star in 2011, HD 189567 b. This exoplanet has an estimated minimum mass of 8.5 Earth masses, which means that it is most likely a mini-Neptune. It has an orbital period of 14.3 days, placing it well interior to the habitable zone of the star system. The planet's existence was confirmed in 2021, along with the discovery of a second planet, HD 189567 c.

References 

G-type main-sequence stars
189567
Pavo (constellation)
7644
098959
Gliese and GJ objects
J20053286-6719156
CD-67 2385
Planetary systems with two confirmed planets